Yohanes Ghebregergis (born 1 January 1989) is an Eritrean long distance runner. He competed in the men's marathon at the 2017 World Championships in Athletics, placing 7th in 2:12:07. He competed at the 2020 Summer Olympics in the men's marathon.

He finished in 7th place in the men's race of the 2017 Tokyo Marathon.

References

External links
 

1989 births
Living people
Eritrean male long-distance runners
Eritrean male marathon runners
World Athletics Championships athletes for Eritrea
Place of birth missing (living people)
Athletes (track and field) at the 2020 Summer Olympics
Olympic athletes of Eritrea
Olympic male marathon runners
21st-century Eritrean people